Harald Huysman (born 7 January 1959) is a former racing driver from Norway from  Dutch Decent

He competed in FF1600 (Formula Ford) in which he won the Benelux and European championships, F3, World Sports Car Championship and Le Mans as well as Indy Lights, Toyota Atlantic, Barber Saab Pro Series and the Porsche Supercup.

Since ending his own driving career he has been manager for Jenson Button and more recently a number of other junior racing talents. He also discovered and helped Kimi Räikkönen enter Formula One. He previously ran a karting facility in Oslo and has developed a portfolio of motoring business interests including a BMW dealership in Oslo, importing Porsches to Norway and organising corporate events. Huysman is the majority shareholder in Rudskogen race circuit, Norway's national motorsport facility, which underwent huge development (Michael Schumacher is also a shareholder).

He has also been a Formula 1 commentator for Norwegian TV.

Racing record

24 Hours of Le Mans results

Indy Lights

References

External links 
 Harald Huysman Karting website - in Norwegian
 Rudskogen Motorsenter
 Huysman Nystuen Partners Client & Event Management

1959 births
Living people
Sportspeople from Fredrikstad
Norwegian racing drivers
Indy Lights drivers
SCCA Formula Super Vee drivers
Atlantic Championship drivers
British Formula 3000 Championship drivers
24 Hours of Le Mans drivers
World Sportscar Championship drivers
Barber Pro Series drivers
24 Hours of Spa drivers

Tasman Motorsports drivers